Beauty and the Beast is a Disney media franchise comprising a film series and additional merchandise. The success of the original 1991 American animated feature, Beauty and the Beast, directed by Gary Trousdale and Kirk Wise, led to three direct-to-video follow-up films, a live-action spin-off television series, a Disney World stage show, a Disney World restaurant, a trackless dark ride, several video games, merchandise, and the 10th longest-running musical in Broadway history, which was nominated for nine Tony Awards, winning for Best Costume Design. In March 2017, Disney released a live-action adaptation of the film.

Belle was also added to Disney Consumer Products' Disney Princess franchise.

Titles

Animated films
Beauty and the Beast is the original film of the franchise. It was directed by Gary Trousdale and Kirk Wise. It was produced by Walt Disney Feature Animation, and released in 1991. Beauty and the Beast is the 30th Disney animated feature film and belongs to an era known as the Disney Renaissance. The plot of the film is based on the fairy tale Beauty and the Beast by Jeanne-Marie Le Prince de Beaumont. In 2002, Beauty and the Beast was selected for preservation in the National Film Registry by the Library of Congress for being "culturally, historically, or aesthetically significant". 

Beauty and the Beast: The Enchanted Christmas is the first direct-to-video installment of the film series and served as a holiday special. It was directed by Andrew Knight, and released on November 11, 1997. The film is set within the events of the first film, taking place after the fight with the wolves and before the Beast gives Belle the castle library & ballroom dance. 

Belle's Magical World is the second direct-to-video installment of the film series. It was directed by Cullen Blaine, Daniel de la Vega, Barbara Dourmashkin, Dale Kase, Bob Kline, Burt Medall, and Mitch Rochon. It was released on February 17, 1998, and is also set during the original film, taking place after Christmas, but before the fight against Gaston.

Belle's Tales of Friendship is a live-action/animated direct-to-video installment of the film series. It was directed by Jimbo Mitchell, and released on August 17, 1999. It is set during the original film, and was released in part to help promote Disney Channel's television series, Sing Me a Story with Belle.

Live-action film
On March 17, 2017, Disney released a live-action adaptation of the film, which was directed by Bill Condon. The movie stars Emma Watson as Belle, Dan Stevens as the Beast, Luke Evans as Gaston, Ewan McGregor as Lumière, Ian McKellen as Cogsworth, Emma Thompson as Mrs. Potts, Kevin Kline as Maurice, and Josh Gad as LeFou.

Television series

Sing Me a Story with Belle

Sing Me a Story with Belle was a live-action spin-off series created by Patrick Davidson and Melissa Gould. It featured Belle, who now owns and manages the bookshop in the village. The show ran for 65 episodes on The Disney Channel from September 8, 1995 to December 11, 1999. Two episodes from the first season were released with an episode of an abandoned Beauty and the Beast cartoon series and were released direct-to-video as Belle's Tales of Friendship.

Little Town

A limited streaming television series centered on Gaston and LeFou is currently in development for Disney+. The series, which will be a prequel to the 2017 film, will be created and written by Josh Gad, Eddy Kitsis and Adam Horowitz, with Gad, Kitsis and Horowitz executive-producing the series alongside Luke Evans. Evans and Gad will reprise their roles from the 2017 film as Gaston and LeFou, respectively. In June 2021, Brianna Middleton joined the cast as female lead. In January 2022, Jelani Alladin and Fra Fee joined the cast. In February 2022, Rita Ora joined the cast, later the same month Disney+ temporary passed the project.

Television special

Beauty and the Beast: A 30th Celebration

A musical television special produced by Jon M. Chu and directed by Hamish Hamilton aired on December 15, 2022, on ABC. The special included live never-before-seen musical performances, along with new sets and costumes inspired by the animated film. H.E.R. has been cast to play Belle. The rest of the cast featured Josh Groban, Joshua Henry, Rita Moreno, Martin Short, Shania Twain, and David Alan Grier as the Beast, Gaston, the narrator, Lumière, Mrs. Potts, and Cogsworth, respectively. Paige O'Hara and Richard White, the original voices of Belle and Gaston, respectively, and composer Alan Menken made cameos in the special.

Broadway musical

A musical, based on the original animated film, debuted April 18, 1994, on Broadway at the Palace Theatre and later transferred to the Lunt-Fontanne Theatre in 1999. The musical was directed by Robert Jess Roth, produced by Disney Theatrical, and written by Linda Woolverton. Beauty and the Beast ran on Broadway for 5,461 performances between 1994 and 2007, becoming Broadway's eighth longest-running production in history. The musical has grossed more than $1.4 billion worldwide and played in thirteen countries and 115 cities. The stage version included many songs not included in the musical, such as the deleted songs "Human Again" (whose demo was 9 minutes long) and "Gaston (Reprise)", a Beast number - "If I Can't Love Her", and a Maurice number - "No Matter What". The song "A Change in Me" was kept in the production after being written for Toni Braxton during her stint as Belle.

Games
Beauty and the Beast is an action platformer developed by Probe Software and published by Hudson Soft for the NES. It was released in Europe in 1994. Gaston, logically, is the final boss of the game because he wants to kill the Beast and marry Belle
Disney's Beauty and the Beast is an action platformer for the SNES. It was developed by Probe Entertainment and published by Hudson Soft in North America and Europe on July 1, 1994 and February 23, 1995, respectively. The game was published by Virgin Interactive in Japan on July 8, 1994. The entire game is played through the perspective of the Beast. As the Beast, the player must get Belle to fall in love so that the curse cast upon him and his castle will be broken, she will marry him and become a princess. The final boss of the game is Gaston, a hunter who will try to steal Belle from the Beast. There is even a snowball fight scene in the middle of the game and cutscenes between stages that tells the story of Beauty and the Beast.
Beauty & The Beast: Belle's Quest is an action, platformer for the Sega Mega Drive/Genesis. Developed by Software Creations, the game was released in North America in 1993. It is one of two video games based on the film that Sunsoft published for the Genesis, the other being Beauty & The Beast: Roar of the Beast. Characters from the film like Gaston can help the player past tricky situations. As Belle, the player must reach the Beast's castle and break the spell to live happily ever after. To succeed, she must explore the village, forest, castle, and snowy forest to solve puzzles and mini-games while ducking or jumping over enemies. Belle's health is represented by a stack of blue books, which diminishes when she touches bats, rats, and other hazards in the game. Extra lives, keys and other items are hidden throughout the levels. While there is no continue or game saving ability, players can use a code to start the game at any of the seven levels.
Beauty & The Beast: Roar of the Beast is the title of a side-scrolling video game for the Sega Genesis/Mega Drive. The game was one of two games based on the film released for the Sega Genesis, the other game being Beauty & The Beast: Belle's Quest, both of which were produced by Sunsoft and released in 1993. As the Beast, the player must successfully complete several levels, based on scenes from the film, in order to protect the castle from invading villagers and forest animals and rescue Belle from the evil Gaston. Intermission screenshots between each level help to move the story along, as do mini-games. The Beast can crouch, jump, swing his fists, and use a special roar attack that will freeze the on-screen enemies for a brief period. He can sometimes locate items within a level to restore some of his health, and the game provides unlimited continues. It was often described as having a high difficulty level.
Disney's Beauty and the Beast: A Board Game Adventure is a Disney Boardgame adventure for the Game Boy Color. IGN gave the game a rating of 6.0 out of 10.
Disney's Beauty and the Beast Magical Ballroom contains a collection of mini-games around the characters of the film.
In the Kingdom Hearts series, Beast appears in the first Kingdom Hearts video game as a party member in Hollow Bastion, where he traveled to find Belle, who was kidnapped by Maleficent. Both also appear in Kingdom Hearts: Chain of Memories. A world based on the film, "Beast's Castle", appears in Kingdom Hearts II, Kingdom Hearts 358/2 Days and Kingdom Hearts χ, along wth other characters of the film.
During a limited time Event focused on Beauty and the Beast, the world builder video game Disney Magic Kingdoms included Belle, Beast, Lumière, Cogsworth, Mrs. Potts, Chip and Gaston as playable characters, along with attractions, costumes, and other material based on the film. LeFou and Maurice were also included as playable characters in later updates of the game. In the game the characters are involved in new storylines that serve as a continuation of Beauty and the Beast (also ignoring other material from the franchise).

Other media
Disney's Beauty and the Beast: A Concert on Ice was an ice show adaptation broadcast on CBS December 8, 1996, produced by Micawber Productions and Rodan Productions. The ice show starred Ekaterina Gordeeva as Belle and Victor Petrenko as The Beast with Scott Hamilton as Lumiere while Steve Binder directed and as hosts James Barbour and Susan Egan.
Beauty and the Beast story or characters are included in several Disney on Ice shows including 100 Years of Magic, Follow Your Heart, Magical Ice Festival and Dream Big.
 Beyond the Castle: Stories Inspired by Beauty and the Beast is set of three short films that premiered on Disney's social media via a partnership with Tongal creative crowd sourcing platform and Young Storytellers. Children from the Storytellers, who advance screened the live action movie, wrote scripts base on the characters. The shorts were released around the release of the live action film in 2017.
Beauty and the Curse is a live action film explaining how the beast's curse comes about. Tamara Sims wrote the short and Maya Rudolph was the director.
Pug in a Cup was puppet-based story written by Hana Morshedi and directed by Tucker Barrie about the adventures at a local market of Chip and Gumbo the Pug away from the caste.
LeFouston was claymation short about LeFou and Gaston's first meeting with director Kevin Ulrich and writer Robert Nelson.
A Broadway-caliber short-form stage musical named Beauty and the Beast Live on Stage is performed live in Sunset Boulevard, at Disney's Hollywood Studios, Walt Disney World. It was also performed at Tomorrowland, Disneyland Park (Anaheim) and Discoveryland, Disneyland Park (Paris). Originally, the show was more like a revue, and not a condensed version of either the film or Broadway show. However it changed considerably from the original version to the currently running version, causing it to more closely resemble the 1991 film. Because the show is condensed to approximately 25 minutes, many cuts and edits are made. The show features the award-winning music from the first film.
Be Our Guest Restaurant is a quick service and table service restaurant in Fantasyland at Magic Kingdom in the Walt Disney World Resort. The restaurant has the theme and appearance of the Beast's Castle from Disney's 1991 animated film Beauty and the Beast. The name of the restaurant is a reference to "Be Our Guest", the classic song from that film.
Enchanted Tale of Beauty and the Beast is a trackless dark ride at Tokyo Disneyland telling the story of the film. It opened on September 28, 2020.

Common elements

Plot and themes

The Beauty and the Beast universe encompasses two main locations: a French village and a castle, which are linked by woods. As the three spin-off films all take place within the time period of the original film, the plot of the Beauty and the Beast franchise is encompassed in the original 1991 film, which the other films serving to give added insight to certain parts of the story that were skimmed over (such as when Belle is living in the castle with Beast).

Cast and characters

Crew

Development

History
A 1995 article by the LA Times regarding the then-new Broadway musical adaption of the 1991 movie (the first Disney film to be adapted for the stage), asked if the property was "Disney's Newest Franchise".

Reception
The original Beauty and the Beast film, as well as the stage musical and live-action remake, have received overwhelmingly positive feedback. The various other aspects of the franchise, such as the direct-to-video sequels, have received mixed to negative reviews.

Box office performance

Critical reaction

References

 
Walt Disney Studios (division) franchises
Film series introduced in 1991